Sir William Ashbee Tritton, JP, (19 June 1875 – 24 September 1946) was a British expert in agricultural machinery, and was directly involved, together with Major Walter Gordon Wilson, in the development of the tank. Early in World War I he was asked to produce tractors for moving heavy howitzers, the result being eventually the first tanks.

Early life
Tritton was born in Islington, where his father William Birch Tritton (1845, Hythe, Kent – 29 July 1918) and mother Ellen Hannah Ashbee (16 December 1847 – 19 April 1921) lived at 51 Carleton Road. His parents had married on 22 October 1873 in Boughton under Blean, Kent. His brother was Percy Kingsnorth Tritton (1878–1903). He was the son of a London stockbroker, educated at Christ's College, Finchley and King's College London. By 1901 he was living in Altrincham.

Career
He joined Gwynnes Pumps in 1891. He later became a linotype mechanic and an electrical engineer.

In 1906 he joined William Foster & Co. on Waterloo Street in Lincoln, and from 1911 until 1939 he was Managing Director of the company, after which he became Chairman. On 22 July 1915, it was decided on the proposal for the tank – 28 tons, to cross a trench four feet wide.

The tank was developed at Foster's Wellington Works on Firth Road and tested on a field south of the Lincoln Avoiding Line, a railway line that closed in 1985. The site of Foster's was demolished in 1984. He was the production engineer for the tank at Fosters. He had the idea for steering the tank with the rear wheels. Major Ernest Swinton and Major Walter Dally Jones thought up the name tank. 

The construction of the first tank at Fosters began on 11 August 1915. World War I tanks were also built by Metro-Cammell of Wednesbury and a number of other contractors. Foster's was, at the time, the only company in the UK that were commercially making caterpillar-tracked vehicles.

Personal life
In 1916 he married Isobella Johnstone White, of Scotland, in Willesden. He was knighted on 21 February 1917. He was a JP in Kesteven from 1934. He died in Lincoln aged 71 in September 1946. His wife died in Lincoln on 15 November 1950. He had lived on Eastcliff Road, Lincoln.

Tritton Road in Lincoln is named after him and a blue plaque is located at the entrance of a supermarket at the northern end of the road around the site of the original factories.

References

The Times Obituary, September 1946.

External links
 Making History
 Family tree
 Kent ancestors

Alumni of King's College London
English mechanical engineers
English inventors
English justices of the peace
History of the tank
Knights Bachelor
People from Islington (district)
People from Lincoln, England
1875 births
1946 deaths
People educated at Christ's College, Finchley